Syria competed at the 2018 Mediterranean Games in Tarragona, Spain from 22 June to 1 July 2018.

Medals

Weightlifting 

Ali Alhazzaa won the silver medal in the men's 94 kg Clean & Jerk event. Majd Hassan won the bronze medal in the men's 105 kg Clean & Jerk event.

References 

Nations at the 2018 Mediterranean Games
2018
2018 in Syrian sport